Wide Awake is the third and final album by English pop group Frazier Chorus, released in 1995 by Pinkerton Records. In 1996, Pure Records released the album in the US with a different running order and three extra tracks.

Track listing

1995 UK CD

1996 U.S. CD

Personnel
Musicians
Tim Freeman
Luke Gordon – programming 
Jamie Freeman – guitars
Max More – keyboards
Benny Dimassa – drums
Johnny Knowles – horns
Marilena Buck – vocals ("Thank You")
Ben Blakeman – guitar ("Here We Are")
General de Gaulle – accordion

Technical
Richard Digby Smith – producer
Kevin Westenberg – cover portrait (U.S. edition)
Kaechele & Kaechele Design – art direction (U.S. edition)
Lisa Grey – design (U.S. edition)

References 

1995 albums
Frazier Chorus albums